Klaus Fesser is a professor for theoretical physics at Department of Physics at the University of Greifswald, Germany.

Director
Now, he is the director of the Department of Physics.

Subjects of lectures
 Seminar of theoretical physics 
 Laboratory practical course II 
 Theoretical solid-state physics II 
 Seminar: special problems of theoretical physics 
 Special chapters of the solid theory 
 Physical colloquium

Research field
 low-dimensional condensed matter
 nonlinear dynamics in plasma
 bifurcation theory
 carbon nanotube

External links
 more details

21st-century German physicists
Living people
Academic staff of the University of Greifswald
Year of birth missing (living people)